The Australian Film Institute Award for Best Television Documentary is an award that was handed out to producers annually between 1990 and 1997 by the Australian Film Institute. In 1998, this Award was replaced equivalent Awards in the non-feature film category including Australian Film Institute Award for Best Feature Length Documentary, Australian Film Institute Award for Best Documentary Under One Hour and Australian Film Institute Award for Best Direction in a Documentary.

See also
 Australian Film Institute
 AFI Awards
 Australian Film Institute Television Awards

References

Australian Film Institute Awards